Michael J. Walsh ( since 2003) is an American designer and creative director who has worked or consulted at the School of Visual Arts, Harry N. Abrams, the Walt Disney Company, Time Inc, Turner Broadcasting, Time Warner and The Washington Post Magazine, among others. He has won over 300 awards for design and art direction in American and international awards competitions for digital, video, exhibition design, multimedia projects and print projects.

Work Represented in the Following Collections
AIGA Archives at the Denver Art Museum—Permanent Collection
Columbia University—Permanent Collection at Butler Library
Cooper-Hewitt, National Design Museum—Permanent Collection
International Center of Photography (ICP) Library
Library of Congress—Permanent Collection & Special Collections Reading Room
Metropolitan Museum of Art, Thomas J. Watson Library
Museum of Modern Art (MoMA) —Permanent Collection, Library & Archives
The Wolfsonian Museum—Florida International University Collection of Art & Design
Yale University—Robert B. Haas Family Arts Library

Work Featured in the Following Publications
Becoming A Graphic Designer  (4th Edition)
Steven Heller /Teresa Fernandes, <Wiley Publishers>

New Ornamental Type: Decorative Lettering in the Digital Age 
Steven Heller/Gail Anderson, <Thames & Hudson Publishers>

The Language of Graphic Design: An Illustrated Handbook for Understanding Fundamental Design Principles  
Richard Poulin, <Rockport Publishers>
 
Visible Signs: An Introduction to Semiotics in the Visual Arts (2nd edition)
David Crow, <Ava Academia Publishing, United Kingdom>

Awards and honors include: 
American Illustration
American Institute of Graphic Arts (AIGA)
AIGA 50 books/50 covers
American Photography 
American Association of Museums (AAM) 
Applied Arts 
Art Direction Magazine 
Art Directors Club (ADC), New York & D.C.,
Art Direction & Design (AD&D) UK 
Benjamin Franklin Book Awards PMA
Communication Arts Magazine
Cooper-Hewitt National Design Award 
Creativity Magazine
The Creative Review Annual UK 
International Davey Awards
Design Observer/American Institute of Graphic Arts Graphis Design Annual
Graphis Poster Competition
Higher Education 25th Annual Advertising Awards
HOW In-HOWse Design Awards, Best of Show
HOW International Design Awards
HOW Magazine “Perfect 10’’ Awards
HOW Promotion & Marketing Design Awards
I.D. Annual Design Review
LERN International Awards 
Literary Marketplace (LMP), Individual Achievement award
New York Book Show
One Show Design
Print Magazine Creativity + Commerce Business
Red Dot Award 
Society of Newspaper Designers (SND)
Society of Publication Designers (SPD)
Summit International Creative awards
Sunday Magazine National Cover competitions
Type Directors Club
University & College Designers Association (UCDA)W3 Web design awards
Webby Awards 
Web Marketing Association University & College Designers Association (Excellence 2005, Gold 2006, Excellence 2009, Excellence 2010, Excellence 2012, Excellence 2013, Excellence 2014), GRAPHIS (2010, 2011, 2012, 2013, 2014, 2015), and the Red Dot International Design Awards.

References

American designers
Year of birth missing (living people)
Living people